Catherine Jane Smith (born 16 June 1985) is a British politician who has served as Member of Parliament (MP) for Lancaster and Fleetwood since 2015. A member of the Labour Party, she was a member of the shadow cabinets of Jeremy Corbyn and Keir Starmer from 2016 to 2021 as Shadow Secretary of State, previously Shadow Minister, for Young People and Democracy.

Early life and education
Smith was born in Barrow-in-Furness. She has said that she "didn't have a political upbringing". Her mother was a Methodist, and through going to church with her Smith became involved with youth movements in the church. Her father was a trade unionist. She attended Parkview School (in 2009 this merged into Furness Academy) and Barrow Sixth Form College. In 2003, she began studying for a bachelor's degree at Lancaster University. She was a member of Cartmel College and initially studied religious studies, but switched to a joint honours degree in sociology and gender studies, from which she graduated in 2006. Smith was elected the Women's Officer for Lancaster University Students' Union, a sabbatical role, and served in the 2006–2007 academic year.

Political career

Early political career 
Smith first stood for election as a Labour Party candidate for University ward on Lancaster City Council in 2007. She came fifth with 98 votes. She supported John McDonnell for leader in the 2007 Labour Party leadership election. In the same year, she was a candidate for Labour Party National Executive Committee (NEC) Youth Representative.

Smith worked as an office manager for the Christian Socialist Movement from 2007 to 2009 before working as a research and constituency worker for three Members of Parliament (MPs) from 2009 to 2012: Jeremy Corbyn, Katy Clark, and Bob Marshall-Andrews. Smith was the Labour Party candidate for Wyre and Preston North constituency in the 2010 general election, but she was unsuccessful and came in a narrow third behind the Liberal Democrat candidate. In 2020 she told Lancs Live, "I had been called because there was no Wyre and Preston candidate for Labour... I wasn't expecting to win but I was happy to make the case for Labour to the constituents."

In 2010–2011, Smith was chair of Compass Youth. In 2011, a majority of the Compass Youth committee, including Smith, resigned in protest at Compass' decision to become a cross-party body. Those that resigned set up a new organisation called Next Generation Labour, which Smith chaired for a period. From 2012 to 2015, Smith worked as a campaigns and policy officer for the British Association of Social Workers (BASW). In 2013, she was selected as the Labour candidate to contest Lancaster and Fleetwood constituency at the next election.

Member of Parliament 
Smith won Lancaster and Fleetwood in the 2015 general election, defeating the Conservative incumbent Eric Ollerenshaw. Smith became a member of the Socialist Campaign Group within the Parliamentary Labour Party after her election. Following Labour's overall defeat, however, party leader Ed Miliband resigned. In the ensuing leadership election, Smith was a supporter of Jeremy Corbyn's candidacy and was one of 36 Labour MPs to nominate him for leader. In June 2015, Smith was elected as chair of the All-Party Parliamentary Group on Cuba. In July, she was one of 48 Labour MPs to defy the whip and vote against the Welfare Reform and Work Bill.

Following Corbyn's election as Labour leader, Smith was appointed as a shadow minister in the Women & Equalities Office, working under Kate Green.

She has been critical of the 2016 European Union referendum, saying that younger people preferred to remain in the EU, while the majority result was to leave.

Front bench
On 27 June 2016 Smith entered the Shadow Cabinet as Shadow Minister for Voter Engagement and Youth Affairs. This followed on from a series of resignations of shadow ministers who had lost confidence in Corbyn's leadership. On 6 April 2020, Smith was re-appointed to her shadow cabinet role by the newly elected Labour Party Leader, Keir Starmer.

In addition to her other duties, Smith served as Shadow Deputy Leader of the House, in which role she made her debut at the Despatch Box on 20 December 2016.

On 29 November 2021, during a shadow cabinet reshuffle, Smith resigned from her role on the frontbench. She suggested that she had been offered the opportunity to remain in her brief, but cited concerns over the suspension of former party leader Jeremy Corbyn and lack of front bench support for proportional representation.

Expenses
On 24 May 2016, Lancashire Constabulary announced that an investigation had been opened following allegations that Smith broke election spending laws by spending thousands of pounds more than she declared, relating to a visit by a nationally organised Labour "battlebus" to her constituency. In June 2016, Lancashire Constabulary were granted a year-long extension to investigate Smith's election expenses, and in November 2016 they cleared Smith of any wrongdoing.

Personal life
Smith married her partner of eleven years, Ben Soffa, in September 2016. Soffa has worked as head of digital organising for the Labour Party since 2015. In July 2018, Smith gave birth to the couple's first child. In October 2020 she revealed in a letter posted to Twitter that she was separating from her husband. Smith is currently in a relationship with SNP MP David Linden.

Smith identifies as bisexual.

In 2010, Smith was diagnosed with postural orthostatic tachycardia syndrome (POTS), which she says has affected her energy levels, and which she uses medication to control.

Smith is a Methodist, and is co-founder of Christians for Choice, a project of Abortion Rights.

Notes

References

External links

Profile at labour.org.uk
CatSmithMP on Twitter

1985 births
Living people
Alumni of Lancaster University
Alumni of Cartmel College, Lancaster
English republicans
English socialists
Proponents of Christian feminism
English Methodists
Female members of the Parliament of the United Kingdom for English constituencies
Members of the Parliament of the United Kingdom for constituencies in Lancashire
Labour Party (UK) MPs for English constituencies
Bisexual feminists
Bisexual politicians
Bisexual women
LGBT Methodists
LGBT members of the Parliament of the United Kingdom
English LGBT politicians
Methodist socialists
People from Barrow-in-Furness
Socialist feminists
UK MPs 2015–2017
UK MPs 2017–2019
UK MPs 2019–present
21st-century British women politicians